Valerie Martin (née Metcalf; born March 14, 1948) is an American novelist and short story writer.

Her novel Property (2003) won the Orange Prize for Fiction. In 2012, The Observer named Property as one of "The 10 best historical novels".

Early life
Martin was born in Sedalia, Missouri, to John Roger Metcalf and Valerie Fleischer Metcalf. Her father was a sea captain and her mother was a housewife whose family goes back several generations in New Orleans, Louisiana. She was raised in New Orleans from the age of three, attending public elementary school and a Catholic high school (Mount Carmel Academy). She earned a Bachelor of Arts degree from the University of New Orleans in 1970 and graduated from the MFA Program for Poets & Writers at the University of Massachusetts Amherst in 1974. In the 1970s, Martin took a writing course at Loyola University New Orleans taught by Southern novelist Walker Percy.

Academic career
Martin has taught at multiple colleges and universities in the United States, in both visiting and tenure-track positions.

 1978–1979: University of New Mexico, Las Cruces (visiting lecturer in creative writing)
 1980–1984 and 1985–1986: University of New Orleans (assistant professor of English)
 1984–1985: University of Alabama (writer-in-residence/visiting associate professor)
 1986–1989: Mount Holyoke College (lecturer in creative writing)
 1989–1997: University of Massachusetts Amherst (associate professor of English)
 1998–1999: Loyola University New Orleans (visiting writer-in-residence)
 1999 and 2002: Sarah Lawrence College (visiting writer)
 2009–present: Mount Holyoke College (professor of English)

While at the University of Alabama, Martin lived a few blocks away from novelist Margaret Atwood and they became friends. Martin was the first person to read the completed manuscript of Atwood's The Handmaid's Tale, claiming she told Atwood that the book would make her rich. Atwood returned the favor and read some of Martin's then-unpublished works, and liked them enough to send them to editor and publisher Nan A. Talese, who has remained Martin's editor ever since.

Writing career
Martin's fictional works include Set in Motion (1978), Alexandra (1979), A Recent Martyr (1987), The Consolation of Nature and Other Stories (1988), The Great Divorce (1993), Italian Fever (1999), The Unfinished Novel and Other Stories (2006), Trespass (2007), and The Confessions of Edward Day (2009). She also wrote a biography of St. Francis of Assisi titled Salvation: Scenes from the Life of St. Francis (2001). Her most recent novel, The Ghost of the Mary Celeste, was published in 2014, and Sea Lovers: Selected Stories appeared in 2016.

Her 1990 novel, Mary Reilly, a retelling of The Strange Case of Dr. Jekyll and Mr. Hyde from the point of view of a servant in the doctor's house, won the Kafka Prize in 1990 and has been translated into 16 languages. It was released as a film in 1996 by Columbia TriStar Pictures, directed by Stephen Frears and starred John Malkovich as Dr. Jekyll and Julia Roberts as Mary.

The short film Surface Calm (2001), directed by Michael Miley, is based on her short story of the same title from her first book, Love (1977).

With her niece, poet Lisa Martin, she has written a trilogy of children's books about cats named Anton and Cecil.

Personal life
She was married to artist Robert M. Martin from 1970 until their divorce in 1984. They had one daughter, Adrienne, born in 1975.

Martin resides in Dutchess County, New York.  She lived with her partner, the translator John Cullen, and her cat named Jackson Gray. Cullen died in April 2021. She enjoys gardening. 

Martin has continued to teach at the college level even though her writing career has been successful, sometimes taking breaks from the classroom in order to complete a work. She says she needs the social activity of working with young authors to balance the solitary activity that is writing. She initially writes in longhand, later transferring the text to a computer.

Works

Novels
Set in Motion (1978)
Alexandra (1979)
A Recent Martyr (1987)
Mary Reilly (1990)
The Great Divorce (1994)
Italian Fever (1999)
Property (2003)
Trespass (2007)
The Confessions of Edward Day (2009)
The Ghost of the Mary Celeste (2014)

Collections
Love: Short Stories (1977)
The Consolation of Nature, and Other Stories (1988)
The Unfinished Novel and Other Stories (2006)
Sea Lovers (2015)

Non-fiction
Salvation: Scenes from the Life of St. Francis (2001)

Children's
Anton and Cecil: Cats at Sea (2013)
Anton and Cecil: Cats on Track (2015)
Anton and Cecil: Cats Aloft (2016)

Awards and honors
Louisiana Endowment for the Arts grant (1983)
Kafka Prize (1990)
National Education Association award (1990)
World Fantasy Best Novel nominee (1991): Mary Reilly
Nebula Best Novel nominee (1991): Mary Reilly
Orange Broadband Prize for Fiction Best Book winner (2003): Property
Louisiana Writer Award (2010)
Guggenheim Fellowship (2011)

References

External links 

Audio recording of Valerie Martin reading from Property at the 2009 Key West Literary Seminar
Archived audio interview with Valerie Martin at Wired for Books.org by Don Swaim

1948 births
Living people
20th-century American novelists
21st-century American novelists
20th-century American women writers
21st-century American women writers
American women novelists
Novelists from Missouri
Novelists from Louisiana
Novelists from Massachusetts
Novelists from New York (state)
University of New Orleans alumni
University of Massachusetts Amherst MFA Program for Poets & Writers alumni
University of New Mexico faculty
University of New Orleans faculty
University of Alabama faculty
Mount Holyoke College faculty
University of Massachusetts Amherst faculty
Loyola University New Orleans faculty
Sarah Lawrence College faculty
American women academics